Mattha is a beverage that originates from the Indian subcontinent. It is made from dahi (yogurt) or buttermilk mixed with spices and sugar. Plain buttermilk is also called Mattha in the Indian states of Bihar, Tripura, Uttar Pradesh, West Bengal and Bangladesh  Ingredients added to buttermilk to make mattha may include mint, roasted cumin seeds, asafoetida, curry leaves, salt and sugar.

Mattha may also be smoked before serving for flavour. It is generally served before or after a meal, though it can also be consumed with the meal, and it is thought to help with digestion. Mattha is similar to Chaas, which is also called chhanch or ghol, but spicier and is known as Mohi in Nepal.

Similar drink

Lassi

Lassi is a popular summer yogurt drink from India, Bangladesh and Pakistan.

Borhani

Borhani is a sweet and spicy drink from Bangladesh usually consumed during weddings and parties or celebrations such as  Rojarīd and Korban. It is popular during the hot months.

Chass

Chass is a popular Indian drink.

Ghol
Ghol is a Bengali drink similar to mattha. It is usually consumed during Romjan in Bangladesh.

See also
 Lassi
 Ayran
 Leben
 Doogh
 Dahi
 Milkshake
 List of smoked foods
 List of yogurt-based dishes and beverages

References

External links

Indian drinks
Milk-based drinks
Punjabi cuisine
Yogurt-based drinks
Smoked food